Karanar is a village in the Vezirköprü, Samsun Province, Turkey.

References

Villages in Vezirköprü District